Shawnee Mission East High School is a public high school in Prairie Village, Kansas, United States, for grades 9 through 12.  It is one of five high schools operated by the Shawnee Mission USD 512 school district.

Shawnee Mission East High School was established in 1958 in order to serve the growing population of northeast Johnson County, Kansas.  In January 1994, Shawnee Mission East began offering the International Baccalaureate program.

Shawnee Mission East is a member of the Kansas State High School Activities Association and offers a variety of sports programs. Athletic teams compete in the 6A division and are known as the Lancers. Extracurricular activities are also offered in the form of performing arts, school publications, and clubs.

History
Shawnee Mission East High School was established in 1958 to serve the growing population of northeast Johnson County. In January 1994, Shawnee Mission East began offering the International Baccalaureate program.

Academics
Shawnee Mission East has been an IB World School since January 1994.

According to Niche, Shawnee Mission East is #5 on the list of best public schools in Kansas, and #712 on the list of best public schools in the nation as of 2021. According to US News, Shawnee Mission East is #1,033 on the list of best high schools nationally, and #6 in Kansas (behind Sumner Academy). The school has reported a 98% graduation rate in 2021.

Extracurricular activities

Athletics
The Lancers compete in the Sunflower League and are classified as a 6A, the largest classification in Kansas according to the KSHSAA. Throughout its history, Shawnee Mission East has won many state championships in various sports. Shawnee Mission East also has a cheerleading and dance team, called the Lancer Dancers.

State championships

Notable alumni

 Sandahl Bergman, actress, won the Golden Globe Award for New Star of the Year for her role in Conan the Barbarian
 Barbara Bollier, member of the Kansas Senate representing the 7th district, Democratic candidate for US Senate
 Bruce Branit, Emmy-nominated visual effects artist of Westworld (TV series) and Breaking Bad  
 George Brophy, former professional baseball executive
 W. Bruce Cameron, author of A Dog's Purpose and several other novels
 John D. Carmack, video game programmer, id Software co-founder, lead programmer of the classic video game Doom
 Eric Darnell, director, writer, songwriter, animator, voice actor 
 Brooke Dillman, actress and comedian
 Steve Doerr, former professional soccer player
 Donald Fehr, executive director of the National Hockey League Players Association, former Major League Baseball players union representative
 Thomas Frank, founder of The Baffler, Harper's columnist and author of What's the Matter with Kansas?
 Kip Niven, actor
 Nancy Opel, singer/actress with Tony Award nomination
 G.P. "Bud" Peterson, President of the Georgia Institute of Technology
 Ramesh Ponnuru, senior editor for National Review
 Paul Redford, actor, TV writer and producer for Sports Night, The West Wing, The Newsroom
 Melissa Rooker, Kansas House of Representatives
 Jim Roth, member of Oklahoma Corporation Commission, first openly gay statewide official in Oklahoma
 Grant Wahl, writer for Sports Illustrated, author of The Beckham Experiment
 Joey Wentz, professional baseball pitcher

See also

 List of high schools in Kansas
 List of unified school districts in Kansas
Other high schools in Shawnee Mission USD 512 school district
 Shawnee Mission North High School in Overland Park
 Shawnee Mission Northwest High School in Shawnee
 Shawnee Mission South High School in Overland Park
 Shawnee Mission West High School in Overland Park

References

External links
 

Public high schools in Kansas
Educational institutions established in 1958
Schools in Johnson County, Kansas
1958 establishments in Kansas